The list of Olympic men's ice hockey players for Kazakhstan consists of 35 skaters and 3 goaltenders. Men's ice hockey tournaments have been staged at the Olympic Games since 1920 (it was introduced at the 1920 Summer Olympics, and was permanently added to the Winter Olympic Games in 1924). Kazakhstan has participated in two tournaments since becoming independent in 1991: 1998 and 2006.

Eight players (seven skaters and one goaltender) participated in both 1998 and 2006. Six of them – Vladimir Antipin, Dmitri Dudarev, Alexander Koreshkov, Yevgeni Koreshkov, Andrei Pchelyakov, and Konstantin Shafranov – played in the most games, with 12. Yevgeni Koreshkov scored the most goals (7), while his brother Alexander had the most assists (7); they are tied for the most points (11).

Key

Goaltenders

Skaters

See also
 Kazakhstan men's national ice hockey team

Notes

References

 
 
 

Kazakhstan men's national ice hockey team
ice hockey
Kazakhstan
Kazakhstan